The PGM 500 and PGM 2000 are guided bombs developed by Alenia Marconi Systems and now marketed by MBDA. The PGM 500 carries a 500 lb (227 kg) warhead, and the PGM 2000 a 2000 lb (909 kg) one. The weapons are available with interchangeable laser, TV, or infra-red seekers.

The PGM 500 is known as the Hakim in United Arab Emirates service.

Development and design
In 1984, the US company International Signal and Control (ISC) began work on a series of guided bombs and missiles for the United Arab Emirates. ISC was purchased by the British company Ferranti in 1987, with Ferranti in turn becoming part of GEC-Marconi in 1991. Development of the missile programme continued through these changes, with the missiles first displayed in public at the 1994 Farnborough Air Show.

There are two major versions of the missile family, one with a  warhead, called the PGM-500, and one with a  warhead, called the PGM-2000. Four large wings in a "squashed-X" arrangement are fitted at the rear of the missile, with small horizontal fins just behind the missile's nose. The PGM-2000 has an additional stabilising fin under the missile's nose. Both versions are rocket powered, with the PGM-500 having a single solid-fuel rocket slung under the missile body, while the PGM-2000 has two similar rocket engines. Both missiles can be fitted with semi-active laser guidance, TV guidance or imaging infra-red guidance, with a date-link pod required aboard the launch aircraft for the latter two options.

An unpowered version, called Lancelot, was proposed in 1993 to meet a UK requirement for a laser-guided bomb, but this was unsuccessful. A revised version, called Centaur was offered to the UAE, but this too was rejected in favour of a version of Storm Shadow, called Black Shaheen.

Service
Production of the laser- and TV-guided variants began in 1990, entering service with the United Arab Emirates Air Force in 1992. The IR-guided weapons entered production in 1993 and entered service in 1995.

Combat use 
 Yemen Civil War (2015-)

References

External links
 MDBA PGM page

Guided bombs